John James is a Canadian musician, who was prominent in the early 1990s for his funk-influenced brand of dance music. He released two albums, Big Fat Soul in 1990 and Mothers of Hope in 1993.

He garnered two Juno Award nominations at the Juno Awards of 1991, for Most Promising Male Vocalist of the Year and Dance Recording of the Year for his single "I Wanna Know", and one nomination at the Juno Awards of 1994 for R&B/Soul Recording for Mothers of Hope.

Prior to releasing his own recordings, James was a session musician, including playing saxophone on Corey Hart's "Sunglasses at Night" tour opening for April Wine during their farewell tour.

Discography
Big Fat Soul (1989)
Mothers of Hope (1992)

References

Year of birth missing (living people)
Musicians from Toronto
Canadian male singers
Living people
Canadian dance musicians
Canadian session musicians
People from Woodstock, Ontario
Canadian saxophonists
Male saxophonists
21st-century saxophonists
21st-century Canadian male musicians